Reginald Gray may refer to:
Reginald Gray (MP), Member of Parliament for Weymouth 1562/3–1570
Sir Reginald Gray (barrister) (1851–1935), Bermudian politician and barrister
Reginald Gray (artist) (1930–2013), Irish portrait painter
Reggie Gray (born 1984), American football player

See also
Reginald Grey (disambiguation)